Cape Cornwall Mine was a tin mine on Cape Cornwall, a cape at the western tip of Cornwall, England, United Kingdom. It operated intermittently between 1838 and 1883, after which time it closed permanently and the engine house was demolished. The mine's 1864 chimney near the peak of the cape was retained as an aid to navigation, and in the early 20th century the former ore dressing floors were for a time converted into greenhouses and wineries. In 1987 the site was donated to the nation by the H. J. Heinz Company. The remains of Cape Cornwall Mine now form part of the Cornwall and West Devon Mining Landscape, a UNESCO World Heritage Site.

History
Cape Cornwall Mine opened in 1838 during the Cornish mining boom. The mine was sited on Cape Cornwall itself at the western extremity of Great Britain, 1.2 miles (1.9 km) west of the town of St Just. The small and relatively unremarkable mine closed in 1849.

In 1864 the mine was reopened under the ownership of St Just Consolidated Mines, and an engine house with an elaborate chimney was built near the peak of the cape to serve the boiler of the mine's whim (a machine for raising ore to the surface). The engine house and its associated boiler house were built near the foot of the hill and connected to the chimney stack by a long stone flue. With surrounding steep cliffs limiting the space for ore dressing, "spalling braces" (platforms attached to the shaft) were fitted to house spalling (breaking the ore into chunks for sorting) operations. In 1869 St Just Consolidated Mines abandoned the Cape Cornwall Mine, although it continued to operate independently until 1875.

In 1879 the mine was once more reopened, this time under the ownership of St Just United. The chimney draught of the 1864 chimney was causing problems, and in 1880 the chimney was abandoned and replaced with a new chimney stack further downhill. The 1864 chimney stack was considered a valuable navigational aid, and was not demolished.

By this time the Cornish mining industry was in sharp decline, as the Metalliferous Mines Regulation Act 1872 and the Factory and Workshop Act 1878 drastically limited the use of the cheap female and child labour on which the industry depended. In 1883 the mine was permanently abandoned, and shortly afterwards the engine house was demolished.

In 1907 De Beers chairman Francis Oats built Porthledden House, a  country house modelled on Groote Schuur, at Cape Cornwall. The ore sorting floors were converted into greenhouses and wineries, while the surrounding cliffs were planted with mesembryanthemum beds.

Public ownership and World Heritage status

In 1987 Cape Cornwall was purchased for the nation by the H. J. Heinz Company, to commemorate a century of the company's operations in the United Kingdom. Other than Porthledden House, which remains in private ownership, the mine site is now owned and maintained by the National Trust. Heinz's donation is commemorated by a Heinz Baked Beanz label-shaped plaque set into the base of the 1864 chimney. The remains of the mine are included within the Cornwall and West Devon Mining Landscape, a World Heritage Site since 2006.

See also 

 Mining in Cornwall and Devon

Notes, references and external links

Notes

References

Bibliography 

Joseph, Peter (2006), British Mining No 79 – Cape Cornwall Mine, Northern Mine Research Society. 

 (1st edition published 2004 by The Hypatia Trust, Penzance as Balmaidens)

Tin mines in Cornwall
Industrial archaeological sites in Cornwall
Penwith
St Just in Penwith